Wanstead is a London Underground station in Wanstead in the London Borough of Redbridge, east London. on the Hainault loop of the Central line. Towards Central London the next station is Leytonstone. Towards Woodford it is Redbridge. It is in Travelcard Zone 4. It opened on 14 December 1947 as an extension of the Central line to form the new part of the Hainault loop.

History 
The extension of the Central line eastwards from Liverpool Street was first proposed in 1935 by the London Passenger Transport Board. The station at Wanstead George Green would be one of three stations in Tube tunnel between Leytonstone and Newbury Park.

Construction of the station began in the mid 1930s, but was delayed by the onset of World War II. The incomplete tunnels between Wanstead and Gants Hill to the east were used for munitions production by Plessey between 1942 and 1945. The station was finally opened on 14 December 1947. The building, like the other two below ground stations on the branch, was designed by architect Charles Holden. It kept its original wooden escalator until 2003, one of the last Tube stations to do so.

The station has been extensively refurbished since 2006, including the replacement of the original platform wall tiling, which had become badly damaged.

According to rumours, the site of William Penn's Home in Wanstead was on that of the station.

Connections

The station is served by London Buses routes 66, 101, 145, 308, W12, W13 and W14, and also by night routes N8 and N55.

Gallery

References

External links
Wanstead station on CharlesHolden.com 

London Underground Night Tube stations
Central line (London Underground) stations
Tube stations in the London Borough of Redbridge
Railway stations in Great Britain opened in 1947
Charles Holden railway stations
1947 establishments in England